Edgar Barbara Sylla (born 22 March 1972) is a Guinean former professional footballer who played as a defender. He was a squad member at the 1994 and 1998 Africa Cup of Nations.

References

1972 births
Living people
Guinean footballers
Guinea international footballers
1994 African Cup of Nations players
1998 African Cup of Nations players
Évry FC players
Association football defenders
Guinean expatriate footballers
Expatriate footballers in France
Guinean expatriate sportspeople in France